The 2010–11 Liga Indonesia Premier Division is Persiraja Banda Aceh's fourth season since the inception of Liga Indonesia Premier Division.

Players
unknown

Transfer
unknown

Competitions

Liga Indonesia Premier Division

Results summary

Table

Fixtures and results

First round

Second round

Group A 
 5 matches were played in Mandala Stadium, Jayapura, Papua.
 1 match were played in Barnabas Youwe Stadium, Sentani, Jayapura Regency, Papua.
 All times are Eastern Indonesia Time (WIT) – UTC+09:00.

Day 1

Day 3

Day 6

Knockout phase

Semifinal

Final

References

Persiraja Banda Aceh seasons
Persiraja Banda Aceh